The Lancashire Cotton Corporation Limited was incorporated 23 January 1929, and became the world's largest spinner of cotton. It acquired 104 mills and closed about half to reduce capacity. In 1950, it operated 53 cotton mills.

The 1950 mills (A–D)

The 1950 mills (E–J)

The 1950 mills (K–N)

The 1950 mills (O–T)

The 1950 mills (U–Z)

Other Mills that were owned before 1951

See also

References
Notes

Bibliography

External links
 Cottontown.org website
 Spinningtheweb.org.uk website
 Interview with Jim Shelmerdine, General manager, Manor Mill, Chadderton

.
Lancashire Cotton Corporation Limited
Cotton industry in England
Lanc
Lancashire Cotton Corp
Lists of buildings and structures in Lancashire
.Lancashire Cotton Corporation
History of the textile industry in the United Kingdom
History of Lancashire
History of Greater Manchester
Lancashire Cotton Corporation